Chia Nan University of Pharmacy and Science (CNU) is a private university in Rende District, Tainan City, Taiwan.

Its mission is to prepare professionals in the fields of pharmacy, health and management.

Currently, there are 28 departments and graduate schools in six colleges: Pharmacy and Science, Human Ecology, Health and Information, Humanities and Social Sciences, Sustainable Environment, and Leisure and Recreation Management. The university has an enrollment of 16,835 students, and more than 500 full-time faculty members.

The university is active in the fields of pharmacy, cosmetics, food, health care, biotechnology, and environmental pollution prevention. Scholarship, counseling, housing, and international campus are specially tailored to the needs of international students.

History

Chia Nan College of Pharmacy 
 March 1966, Chia Nan College of Pharmacy was established, with Department of Pharmacy (six years).
 1969, additional Department of Healthcare Pharmacy.
 1970, additional Department of Pharmacy (two years).
 1973, Department of Pharmacy (two years) stop recruiting.
 1976, Department of Healthcare Pharmacy stop recruiting.
 1976, additional Department of Applied Chemistry (five years) and Department of Industrial Safety (five years). Department of Applied Chemistry divided into the Group of Farm Pharmaceutical and the Group of Cosmetic.
 1980, additional Department of Food Hygiene (five years).
 1982, Department of Applied Chemistry cancel the Group of Farm Pharmaceutical and the Group of Cosmetic. Additional Department of Industrial Safety and Health for Night School (two years).
 1987, additional Department of Food Hygiene for Night School (two years).
 1988, additional Department of Applied Chemistry for Night School (two years), Department of Applied Chemistry (two years) and Department of Medical Management (five years).
 1990, additional Department of Applied Chemistry (two years) and Department of Environmental Engineering Safety (two years).
 1991, additional Department of Environmental Engineering Safety for Night School (two years).
 1992, additional Department of Environmental Engineering Safety (five years) and Department of Pharmacy for Training Division (three years)
 1993, additional Department of Applied Cosmetic and Management (two years).
 1994, additional Department of Children Nursery (two years).

Chia Nan College of Pharmacy and Science 
 August 1996, reform to Chia Nan College of Pharmacy and Science.
 1997, Department of Applied Chemistry renamed to Department of Medicinal Chemistry.
 1998, additional Department of Information Management and Department of Health and Nutrition, Department of Children Nursery renamed to Department of Childhood Education and Nursery.
 1999, additional Department of Applied Life Science and Health, Department of Teenagers and Children Welfare and Department of Recreation and Healthcare Management. Set the educational program.

Chia Nan University of Pharmacy and Science (2000~present)

Academics

College of Pharmacy and Science

College of Human Ecology

College of Humanities and Applied Information

College of Sustainable Environment

College of Recreation and Health Management

Center of General Education

Transportation

Taiwan Railway West Coast Line 
 Bao'an Station (1.7 km)
 Rende Station (2.0 km)

Bus

Tainan City Bus

Kaohsiung City Bus

Tainan City T-Bike Public Bicycle Rental System 
 February 17, 2017, Chia Nan University of Pharmacy and Science donate rental station and public bicycles, CNU become first private donation agencies on Tainan City. Chia Nan University Station was set up immediately, total 32 bicycles and lock devices, provide students and residents round trip to Bao'an Station and school.

Kaohsiung MRT 
 In 2016, Kaohsiung City Government Mass Rapid Transit Bureau announced Chih-Mei Extension Line, code CM. This route length 7.05 km, start from Gangshan Lujhu Line Dahu Station, along Provincial Highway 1, through Hunei District at Kaohsiung City, Rende District at Tainan City and Chia Nan University of Pharmacy and Science, terminal station plan to set in front Chih-Mei Museum main entrance. But this route not yet audited by the Executive Yuan, so it's not sure whether to build.

See also
 List of universities in Taiwan

1966 establishments in Taiwan
Educational institutions established in 1966
Pharmacy schools
Private universities and colleges in Taiwan
Universities and colleges in Tainan
Universities and colleges in Taiwan
Technical universities and colleges in Taiwan